The Bio21 Institute of Molecular Science and Biotechnology, abbreviated as the Bio21 Institute, is an Australian scientific research institute that focuses on basic science and applied biotechnology.

The institute is managed by the University of Melbourne and is supported by funding from the Victorian Government.

History
Established in 2002 and officially opened in 2005, the research centre conducts interdisciplinary learning and houses research groups specializing in biochemistry, cell biology, chemistry, and other life sciences. Bio21 accommodates over 500 research scientists, students and industry participants, making it one of the largest biotechnology research centres in Australia.

In September 2006, Bio21 formed a partnership with Australian-based global bio-pharmaceutical company CSL Limited. 50 scientists from CSL were relocated to participate in activities at the Bio21. The goal of the partnership was for Bio21 to gain the expertise of industry professionals and for CSL to gain access to state-of-the-art equipment.

See also
Health in Australia

References

External links

2002 establishments in Australia
University of Melbourne
Biochemistry research institutes
Bio21